Gojus ('grove', formerly) is a village in Kėdainiai district municipality, in Kaunas County, in central Lithuania. According to the 2011 census, the village had a population of 3 people. It is located 2 km from Surviliškis, on the right bank of the Nevėžis river, at the opposite side of Šventybrastis.

Demography

References

Villages in Kaunas County
Kėdainiai District Municipality